Philip Springer (born May 12, 1926) is an American composer, best known for co-writing the classic Christmas song "Santa Baby". In a musical career spanning over 70 years, he is credited in 540 musical pieces, including composing songs for numerous well-known singers. He still writes about 35 songs per year.

Biography

Early life 
Philip Springer was born in New York City in 1926 to Jewish parents. His mother, Sylvia, was a concert pianist and his father, Mordecai, a lawyer by profession, was a very musical person. Springer's musical talent was clear from a young age; at six he played a Bach piano piece by ear. Springer went to grade and high school in Cedarhurst, then a rustic small town in Long Island. In 1944 he graduated from High School where he was voted the best singer and also the most musical person of his class in the Lawrence High School year-book.

U.S. Army service 
Springer served as a truck driver in World War II; he was Mickey Rooney's Musical Director in 1945 when he did a show in Regensburg, Germany. When Rooney was discharged, Springer took over the job as composer. The Army show was called "DON'T TOUCH THAT DIAL" and entertained thousands of GIs throughout Bavaria.

Education 
Springer studied composition under Otto Luening at Columbia College, his father's alma mater, graduating in 1950. He was a resident of John Jay Hall and was roommates with Punch Sulzberger, future publisher of The New York Times. During his time at Columbia, he co-composed the music for two Varsity Shows (1948 and 1950) and started writing songs for the popular market. He also played dual piano with pianist Dick Hyman. Springer's first top ten song was "Teasin'" (lyrics by Richard Adler) in 1950 which was recorded by Connie Haines in the US and by The Beverly Sisters in the UK.

Springer took his Master's degree at New York University, studying baroque counterpoint under Gustave Reese. He went on to earn a Ph.D. in composition at the University of California, Los Angeles (UCLA) in 1973. While at UCLA he also studied composition under Leon Kirchner during his time as a visiting professor from Harvard University. Springer's dissertation was the first piece for small orchestra to include the ARP 2600 synthesizer.

Music

Popular songs 
Springer is best known for writing "Santa Baby" with lyricist Joan Javits. They were commissioned to write a Christmas song for Eartha Kitt in 1953. "Santa Baby" has since been covered by a large number of major recording artists, including Madonna, Michael Buble, Taylor Swift, Ariana Grande, Gwen Stefani, Kellie Pickler, Kylie Minogue, Robbie Williams (2019), R.E.M, and in 2016, by Garth Brooks and his wife Trisha Yearwood (featured on their Christmas duets album).

Tamir Music is Springer's publishing entity, and he owns the publishing rights to most of his songs. Tamir Music/Philip Springer owns 100% of "Santa Baby" for the United States, its territories and possessions.

Throughout his career, Springer has had extended collaborations with many highly accomplished lyric writers, such as Fred Ebb, Richard Adler, and the great E.Y. "Yip" Harburg, among many others. His Frank Sinatra classic "How Little it Matters, How Little We Know" was co-written by Carolyn Leigh. For several years, he wrote songs with Senator Orrin Hatch; Hatch dedicated their song "Headed Home" to Hatch's dear friend, Senator Ted Kennedy.

Springer was Yip Harburg's last collaborator before Harburg's death in 1981. Springer's collaboration with Harburg produced 15 songs, one of which, "Time You Old Gypsy Man" was called "a little known masterpiece" by Steven Holden of the New York Times in December 1989.

Springer is one of the last living composers from the "Brill Building" era, where composers, lyricists and publishers all created and collaborated at the famed building at 1619 Broadway in New York City.

Some of Springer's songs by well-known artists include:

 How Little it Matters, How Little We Know - Frank Sinatra, lyrics by Carolyn Leigh (Sinatra recorded it at least two different times and placed it on an album of his own chosen favorites)
 Heartbroken - Judy Garland, lyrics by Fred Ebb
 The Next Time - Cliff Richard, lyrics by Buddy Kaye (No. 1 in England and other European Countries)
 Moonlight Gambler - Frankie Laine, lyrics by Bob Hilliard (Top 10 Billboard)
 All Cried Out - Dusty Springfield, lyrics by Buddy Kaye
 Never Ending - Elvis Presley, lyrics by Buddy Kaye (in the 1967 Presley movie, "Double Trouble")
 Her Little Heart Went to Loveland - Aretha Franklin, lyrics by Buddy Kaye
 Oh John - Eartha Kitt, René Marie (2014), lyrics by Fred Ebb
 Lovin' Spree - Eartha Kitt, lyrics by Joan Javits
 The Day the World Stopped Turning - Johnny Hartman, lyrics by Buddy Kaye
 You Bring Out the Lover in Me - Eydie Gormé, lyrics by Carolyn Leigh
 Peek-A-Boo – Rose Murphy, lyrics by Richard Adler – featured in international Dove Soap Commercial 2013-2014
 Miracles – Kiki Dee, lyrics by Buddy Kaye
 Ten Good Reasons – Donna Loren, lyrics by Buddy Kaye
 Sweet William – Millie Small, lyrics by Buddy Kaye
 Not One Goodbye  – Jaye P. Morgan, lyrics by Redd Evans – #48 Billboard 1955
 Time – lyrics by Buddy Kaye
 Don't Twist with Anyone Else But Me – in the feature film "Twist Around the Clock" starring Chubby Checker

Many of Springer's songs appear on the "greatest hits" albums of the recording artists of this era. Many Springer songs were recorded and popular in foreign languages, including the French version of The Next Time, "Apres Toi" by Richard Anthony; "Allo Maillot" by Frank Alamo and others.

Score writing 
Springer composed and conducted six motion picture scores in Hollywood, including Kill a Dragon (1967); I Sailed to Tahiti with an All Girl Crew (1968); More Dead Than Alive (1969); Impasse (1969); Tell Me That You Love Me, Junie Moon (1970); and Wicked, Wicked (1973).

He also scored episodes of the television series Gunsmoke, Mannix, Then Came Bronson, and Medical Center, and composed the theme for Crosswits, a 1970s game show.

Springer has composed music for more than 20 musical shows, 3 of which were produced in New York City. He composed the score for the off-Broadway musical The Chosen, based on the best-selling novel by Chaim Potok, in 1988. Songs interpolated in Broadway shows include "Salesmanship" (Ziegfeld Follies of '57; lyrics by Carolyn Leigh); and "You'll Make an Elegant Butler" (Tovarich, for which he wrote the opening song for Vivien Leigh in her last Broadway performance; lyrics by Joan Javits).

In 1963 the Metropolitan Opera baritone, George London, announced his intention to take leave from the Opera in order to make his Broadway debut in a musical written by Springer and Javits called Solomon & She. However, London died before this work could come to Broadway.

In 1999, Springer's daughter, Tamar, produced her favorite of her father's works, "The Bells of Notre Dame," a musical-in-concert based on the famous Victor Hugo novel. The concert was presented with singers and a narrator, in classic song style, with lyrics by Faith Flagg and Buddy Kaye. Tamar Springer is currently working on a production of this musical (2020).

Other compositions 
Springer has composed many serious works, including an hour-long requiem titled "Requiem for an Artist: An American Requiem". He wrote this hour-long work in 1995 to express his grief at the recent death of his brother, artist Anthony Springer. Springer has been quoted as saying this was his greatest work.

Some of Springer's other serious works include:

 Three one-act operas;
 A Litany for narrator and instrumental ensemble;
 Over 50 electronic compositions including one of the first all-electronic television scores, broadcast on WABC called "The Space-Watch Murders";
 Patches III, a piece for solo piano and tape, which was broadcast on KPFK radio station in 1970;
 A quadraphonic work called American Fantasy (piece for four loudspeakers);
 A symphonic waltz, "19th Century Waltz", which was played by the Pacific Palisades orchestra in October 2015;
 A violin concerto, which was performed at Merkin Hall with Stuart Canin as soloist.
 A composition of Psalm 121 for piano quartet and soprano which was performed at Mt. St. Mary's College in the spring of 1971.

Teaching 
Springer has taught and inspired a number of musicians over the years. The famous Broadway lyricist Fred Ebb first became involved in theater as an assistant to Springer in the late 1950s, and credits Springer with teaching him how to write songs.

Springer taught electronic music at the UCLA extension from 1974 to 1986; a number of his students went on to make careers in the music world, including Eric Drew Feldman and Bill Bell. In 1981 he worked with Paul Simon, teaching him how to transcribe music.

Springer is also the author of the 1977 book "Switched on Synthesizer", a widely used manual for operating analog synthesizers.

References

External links
Philip Springer Interview NAMM Oral History Library (2021)

1926 births
Living people
20th-century American composers
20th-century American male musicians
21st-century American composers
21st-century American male musicians
American male composers
Columbia College (New York) alumni
Jewish American composers
Lawrence High School (Cedarhurst, New York) alumni
Musicians from New York City
New York University alumni
University of California, Los Angeles alumni